A Love Never Lost is an upcoming Chinese youth historical television series directed by Wang Wei, starring Li Xian, Jessie Li, Wei Daxun, and Zhou You. Set during the late Qing dynasty, the story follows aspiring Chinese youths struggling for their nation during turbulent times.

Plot
The television series focuses on the fate of five aspiring Chinese youths who struggle to save their nation after its defeat in the First Sino-Japanese War.

During the war, China was devastated by the Boxer Rebellion. Noble youth Liang Xiang, revolutionaryYang Kaizhi, and soldier Li Renjun became the first group of progressive young people to study in Japan's non-commissioned military school. Later, the revolutionary party exiled Yu Tianbai. Then, Qiu Hong met up with the first three and began traveling along with them. The destiny of the five youths became closely linked. During their stay in Tokyo, the five youths took oaths, chased love, and struggled to revitalize China. After returning to their country, Liang Xiang attempted to explore the way to make China a wealthy country with strong soldiers.

However, he became deeply trapped in the vortex of power, full of passion but of no use. He eventually realized the central purpose of their revolution and rose in the seclusion. Yang Kaizhi's defeat in the Yanji War successfully thwarted Japanese imperialism, leading him to be hailed as "the hero of the border". He experienced the transformation of life and death in the revolutionary wave and later sacrificed himself to the cause. Meanwhile, the Revolutionary Party, the Constitutionalists, and the Northern Warlords constantly struggled for power. Finally, during the 1911 Revolution, revolutionary fighters overthrew the Qing dynasty, ending the old orders that lasted for thousands of years.

Cast

Main cast
 Li Xian as Liang Xiang
 Jessie Li

Supporting cast
Wu Yue
Zhou You as Li Ren Jun
Wei Daxun as Yang Kai Zhi
Wang Zhen
Niu Jun Feng
Hou Yong
 Li Chengdu
 Jiang Han
 Liu Yitie
 Wang Zhen
 Song Ningfeng
 Bai Ke
 Zhou Zhi
 Ying Zi
 Liu Meihan
 Huo Qing
 Kong Lianshun
 Shi Shi
 Li Qiang
 Zhao Changchun
 Qiao Zhenyu
 Liu Mintao

Special appearance
 Zhu Yawen

Production
On May 11, 2020 the production company officially announced the line up of the series. Li took the lead role of the series after being considered by screenwriters and director as the closest choice for the script. Earlier, Li's agent had revealed that he learned Japanese and horse riding for filming.

Accolades

References

External links
 

Upcoming television series
2010s Chinese television series